Joseph Robert Rodericks (7 June 1927 – 14 July 2010) was the Catholic bishop of the Diocese of Jamshedpur, India.

Biography
Ordained to the priesthood on 24 March 1958 for the Society of Jesus, Rodericks was appointed bishop on 25 June 1970 and was consecrated on 9 January 1971. He resigned the see on 9 June 1996.

See also

Notes

20th-century Roman Catholic bishops in India
20th-century Indian Jesuits
1927 births
2010 deaths
Jesuit bishops